KZMP may refer to:

 KZMP (AM), a radio station (1540 AM) licensed to University Park, Texas, United States
 KZMP-FM, a radio station (104.9 FM) licensed to Pilot Point, Texas, United States